"What Do I Have to Do" is a song by Kylie Minogue.

What Do I Have to Do? may also refer to:

 What Do I Have to Do? (album), a compilation album by Stabbing Westward
 "What Do I Have to Do?" (Stabbing Westward song), 1996
 "What Do I Have to Do", a song by Crystal Shawanda from Dawn of a New Day
 "What Do I Have to Do?" (1937 song), a Tin Pan Alley song by Bob Rothberg and Joseph Meyer